Elmer Hartpence Wene (May 1, 1892 – January 25, 1957) was an American Democratic Party politician who represented New Jersey's 2nd congressional district in the United States House of Representatives from 1937 to 1939 and again from 1941 to 1945. He twice ran unsuccessfully for the New Jersey governorship.

Biography
He was born on a farm near Pittstown, New Jersey on May 1, 1892 to Emanuel S. Wene and Mary J. Kiley. He attended the public schools and Rutgers University in New Brunswick, New Jersey. Wene graduated from New Jersey State Agricultural College with a degree in Poultry husbandry on March 4, 1914. In 1918, he engaged in agricultural pursuits near Vineland, New Jersey.

Wene served on the New Jersey State board of agriculture 1925-1934 and was elected as a Democrat to the Seventy-fifth Congress (January 3, 1937 – January 3, 1939). He was an unsuccessful candidate for reelection in 1938 to the Seventy-sixth Congress. After leaving Congress, he was a member of the Board of Chosen Freeholders of Cumberland County, New Jersey 1939-1941. He was again elected to the Seventy-seventh and Seventy-eighth Congresses (January 3, 1941 – January 3, 1945) but was not a candidate for renomination in 1944. Wene was an unsuccessful candidate for election to the United States Senate the same year.

Wene resumed agricultural pursuits and poultry raising. He was also president and owner of two radio stations in New Jersey. In 1945, he served as an adviser to the Secretary of Agriculture. He was elected to the New Jersey Senate in 1946 and a delegate to the New Jersey State constitutional convention in 1947 that drafted the current New Jersey State Constitution. On June 26, 1948, he was given a recess appointment by President Harry S. Truman as Undersecretary of Agriculture. He was an unsuccessful Democratic candidate for Governor of New Jersey in 1949 and an unsuccessful candidate for election in 1950 to the Eighty-second Congress as well. Wene was unsuccessful for the gubernatorial nomination in 1953.

He died of cancer at the University of Pennsylvania Hospital in Philadelphia, Pennsylvania on January 25, 1957. He had never married or had children. He  was buried in Locust Grove Cemetery, Quakertown, New Jersey.

External links

Elmer H. Wene at The Political Graveyard

References

1892 births
1957 deaths
Democratic Party members of the United States House of Representatives from New Jersey
Democratic Party New Jersey state senators
County commissioners in New Jersey
People from Vineland, New Jersey
Politicians from Hunterdon County, New Jersey
Rutgers University alumni
Deaths from cancer in Pennsylvania
Burials in New Jersey
20th-century American politicians